Volče is a settlement on the right bank of the Soča River in the Municipality of Tolmin in the Littoral region of Slovenia, close to the border with Italy.

Name
Volče was attested in historical sources as Volzana in 1295, Olza in 1338, Walçana in 1340, and Volzane in 1341. The name is derived from the plural demonym *Volčane based on the given name *Vьlkъ, thus originally meaning 'Volk's people' or 'residents of Volk's village'.

Church
The parish church in the settlement is dedicated to Saint Leonard and belongs to the Koper Diocese. A second church, built outside the settlement, is dedicated to the Prophet Daniel.

References

External links
Volče on Geopedia

Populated places in the Municipality of Tolmin